Bad Zwischenahn is a railway station located in Bad Zwischenahn, Germany. The station is located on the Oldenburg–Leer railway. The train services are operated by Deutsche Bahn and NordWestBahn.

Train services
The following services currently call at the station:

Intercity services (IC ) Norddeich - Emden - Leer - Bremen - Hannover - Braunschweig - Magdeburg - Leipzig / Berlin - Cottbus
Regional services  Norddeich - Emden - Oldenburg - Bremen - Nienburg - Hanover
Bremen S-Bahn services  Bad Zwischenahn - Oldenburg - Delmerhorst - Bremen

See also
List of railway stations in Lower Saxony

References

External links 

Railway stations in Lower Saxony
Ammerland
Bremen S-Bahn